Kinwaqucha (Quechua kinwa quinoa, qucha lake, "quinoa lake", also spelled Quinuacocha) is a lake in the Huánuco Region of Peru at a mountain of that name. It is located in the Huacaybamba Province, Cochabamba District, and in the Huamalíes Province, Arancay District.

It belongs to the Cochabamba District.

References 

Lakes of Peru
Lakes of Huánuco Region
Mountains of Peru
Mountains of Huánuco Region